Hydremia (or Hydraemia) is a blood disorder characterized by excessive fluid volume with or without reduction of blood plasma volume.

References

External links 

Hematology
Blood disorders